Clan Mackenzie was the name of four steamships operated by Clan Line

, sold in 1904
, wrecked in 1912 at Cape Trafalgar
, suffered a collision in 1937, a total loss
, ex-Empire Cato, purchased in 1948 and scrapped in 1960

Ship names